The Premios Nuestra Tierra (Our Country Award)  are a recognition that is given to Colombian and some International artists. They have a format similar to that of the Grammy awards, but restricted to the Colombian scope.

History 
The awards began in 2007 and were created by Blanca Luz Holguín, Fernán Martínez and Alejandro Villalobos with the purpose of encouraging Colombian artists and trying to encourage new Colombian singers so that the music industry in Colombia has much greater movement.

In 2008 and 2009 Movistar bought half of the proposal that was renamed "Premios Movistar nuestra tierra" in order to promote its other colombian project "Movistar Radio". Since 2010 the prizes have been renamed "premios nuestra tierra" without any sponsored.

On May 16, 2020, after seven years since the last award ceremony, the ninth edition is held.

Method of choice 
The winners are chosen through an association that has the organization of the awards, where directors participate, some representatives of the Colombian record companies and executives of RCN and Caracol Radio.

The award 
The prize is a heart with musical notes around and a crown at the top representing the heart of Jesus, at the beginning it was a plaque that symbolized the signs that Colombian public buses put to inform people where they are going, however, they realized that the plaque was very uncomfortable, so they tried to modernize the logo to something more comfortable like is the prize that is awarded

Categories 

General

 Best Song of the Year
 Best Artist of the Year.
 Best Album of the Year.
 Best New Artist. 
 Best Producer.

Tropical Pop

 Best Tropical Pop Interpretation.
 Best Tropical Pop Artist of the Year.

Pop

 Best Pop Artist of the Year
 Best Pop Song

Urban

 Best Urban Song of the Year
 Best Urban Artist

Alternative

 Best Alternative Artist
 Better Alternative Interpretation

Vallenato

 Best Performance 
 Best Artist

Tropical

 Best Solo Artist or Tropical Group
 Best Tropical Interpretation

Folkloric

 Best Solo Artist or Folkloric Group of the Year
 Best Performance

Videos

 Best Video for Artist
 Best Music for TV
 Best Movie Soundtrack:

Popular (colombian popular music)

 Best Artist of the year
 Best Song of the Year:

Christian

 Best Christian Song
 Best Christian Artist:

Públic

 Best Interpretation of the Public
 Best Public Artist
 Best Fan Club:

Digital

 Best Website: 
 Twitterer of the Year
 Best DJ:

Artists with more awards

Awards delivery 
The awards have been given annually and uninterrupted since 2007, between the months of March or April

See also

 Latin American television awards

References

External links 

 Web official

Colombian music awards
Latin American television awards
Pages with unreviewed translations